Kireç can refer to the following villages in Turkey:

 Kireç, Dursunbey
 Kireç Köyü